The Realistic Concertmate MG-1 is an analog synthesizer manufactured by Moog Music in 1981 and sold by Radio Shack from 1982 to 1983 under their "Realistic" brand name. It was produced without some standard Moog features, such as pitch and modulation wheels, as a cost-cutting measure aimed at achieving a lower price for the consumer market. The synthesizer also featured a pair of pass-through RCA jacks, which allowed users to mix radio or records into the final live synthesized sound output.

The Moog Concertmate MG-1 is the most widely owned of all vintage Moog synths, probably because it was produced in large quantities for the Tandy Corporation, and also its relatively low price (at the time) of $499.95.

Design 

Although manufactured by Moog, the MG-1 design was done by Paul Schreiber (then employed by Tandy Systems Development). David Luce of Moog was involved with the creation. Schreiber later founded Synthesis Technology and invented the MOTM modular system.

The MG-1 includes:
 Two oscillators with sync & detune, one producing either a Square or Sawtooth waveform, with the other producing either a Pulse or Sawtooth waveform.
 One 24db/oct low pass filter/VCF, that can use the envelope generator, has three-position keyboard tracking, and is capable of self oscillation.
 Three-part envelope generator, with separately adjustable Attack and Decay or Release, and selectable Sustain on or off. The Envelope Generator can be triggered by either the keyboard, or the LFO.
 Oscillator 2 can be tuned independently or hard-synced to Oscillator 1.
 Noise generator. (Digital Pseudo-Random Noise)
 Ring modulation (called "Bell Tone" this is Amplitude Modulation of VCO 1 and 2).
 Polyphonic oscillator. This is a divide-down square wave generator. It is routed to the VCF and the VCA.
 LFO that can modulate the oscillators and the filter using a Triangle, square or random Sample and Hold waveform
 Voltage controlled amplifier with Keyed, Hold, and Envelope modes (accessed via 3-way switch, misleadingly only labelled "Tone Sources" but also affects Poly signal)
 Portamento (called "Glide")
 External Control inputs for pre-MIDI CV/Gate.

The similar Moog Rogue came after the MG-1. An update of Schreiber's Design with Moog's traditional Pitch and Mod wheels added, the Moog developed Rogue also removed the MG-1 polyphonic Tone section. Both models share exactly the same plastic casing, but are different machines in many respects. First, the MG-1 power supply is internal, whereas on the Rogue it is an external wall wart type. Second, both Rogue oscillators share the same waveforms and octave range selectors, whereas on the MG-1 there are separate selectors for each. Third, the MG-1 offers "Bell Tone" (AM Modulation of VCO 1 and 2) not found on the Rogue. The MG-1 has two independent sliders for VCF and VCO modulation instead of the Rogue Mod Wheel. The Pitch Bend Wheel has no equivalent on the MG-1.

The MG-1 was produced in great quantities for distribution in the consumer market. Because it was originally distributed in Radio Shack stores instead of specialized music stores, it is easily found and is usually less expensive than a Rogue despite actually offering more. It is identifiable by the big "REALISTIC" name in white letters on the back (instead of the letters "MOOG") and the lack of Pitch Bend and Modulation wheels but, in smaller print at the back, it clearly states: "Custom manufactured by Moog Music in U.S.A. for Radio Shack, a division of Tandy Corporation".

Polyphonic Sound 

The Polyphonic features of this synth are of particular interest as polyphony was rare in synthesizers of the time.  The square wave based polyphony section is described as a "cheesy organ sound" by some, and well-used by others. Since the polyphony section is independently tunable, it can function as a rudimentary third oscillator, allowing the user to create more complex tones than on similar 2-oscillator synths. All of the sound-generating features come together in a mixer allowing the levels for the two monophonic tone sources, noise, bell tone and polyphony to be adjusted independently. The multiple notes of polyphony feed into the single filter, giving a paraphonic result. In 1982-3, few electronic musical instruments had the MG-1 combination of paraphonic poly section and monophonic synthesizer in one instrument.

It is a common misconception that the Poly tones are not affected by the Contour settings. In reality the Poly tones can be affected by the Rise Time (attack) and Fall Time (decay) sliders. The Contour settings can only affect Polyphony while a key is pressed due to the Polyphonic gate design. When a key is released the polyphony tone for that key stops immediately. Therefore, it is true that the Poly tones are not "faded out" by the Fall time (release) contour setting when a key is released.  Similarly, the Poly tones are not "held" with the two VCOs when in "Continuous" (Hold or drone) mode. The rest of the modulation, including the sample-and-hold, will affect the Polyphonic Signal via the filter section. One thing to note however; the LFO cannot be used to modulate the pitch to create a vibrato of the Polyphony section. Against these limitations, the Polyphony is total, meaning all 32 keys can sound all at once.

Contour Triggering 

When the Contour (Envelope) is triggered by the LFO, it allows for periodic LFO-type waves to be applied to the VCF or VCA, depending on the Rise- and Fall-times. This allows the creation of Saw- and Ramp- waves, as well as asymmetrical Triangle waves and unusual trapezoids, not otherwise found through modulating with the LFO alone.

Unique Modulation Options 

Although this keyboard is often erroneously described as having "less" features than its Moog siblings, the Liberation and the Rogue, there is a patch which only the MG-1 can do: The LFO can have independent amounts sent to the VCOs and the VCF on the MG-1. The Liberation and Rogue have to route both through the Mod Wheel with the same amount level. This is the benefit of not having the standard pitch- and mod-wheels.

Panel Layout 

The synthesizer's features aren't labelled using the usual synthesizer nomenclature, instead using more "laymen friendly" terms such as  "Tone Source" for the oscillators, "Contour" for the envelope with "Rise Time" for Attack Time and "Fall Time" instead of Decay or Release Time. Portamento is called "Glide" and Ring Mod is "Bell Tone".

The colour scheme is more appealing and vibrant and helps distinguish easily between sections, again for an easier understanding by the general public not familiar with analog synthesizers.

The MG-1 in the Present 

Still, this synthesizer is sought-after as an inexpensive way to get the famed "Moog Bass" sounds. It is also somewhat infamous in analog synth circles for having black polyurethane foam insulating the interior which did not keep well over time, turning into a black sludge which clogs the various moving parts in the synth (so much so that entire replacement switches and faders can be bought on eBay, specifically for this synth). As with many analog synthesizers, the MG-1's resale price is slowly rising as alternatives and working instruments become less common, and buyers and sellers congregate online.

Notable users
Although a picture of Elton John holding the MG-1 on his arm appears alongside the description of this synthesizer in Radio Shack's 1982 and 1983 catalogs, he has never actually used it in any of his recordings or performances. The photo was the product of a publicity contract with the Tandy Corporation.

Some professional musicians who have used the MG-1 include 

 Anton Newcombe of Brian Jonestown Massacre
 Math the Band
 Peter Gabriel
 Sam Rosenthal or Black Tape For A Blue Girl
 808 State
 Remy Shand
 KMFDM
 Questlove
 Jesse Johnson of Motion City Soundtrack
 Spokes from The Gutterballs
 Davo from Pull Tiger Tail
 Babasónicos
 The High Llamas
 Stefen Keen (Lake Baikal)
 No Doubt
 Clues
 Motion City Soundtrack
 Robert Schneider (of The Apples in Stereo)
 Sam Hughes (of The Spinto Band)
 Avey Tare of Animal Collective
 Aaron Freeman of Ween
 The Volt per Octaves
 DJ Fonzi of IBOPA
 Man or Astro-Man
 Pond (Australian band)
 Tim Taylor from Brainiac (band)
 John Dwyer Thee Oh Sees
 Kevin Parker of Tame Impala
 Gerling

Notes

Users Manual
 Radio Shack (1982), Realistic Synthesizer by Moog Music

External links
 Moog Concertmate MG-1 Video Demo
 Moog Concertmate MG-1 at Vintage Synth Explorer
 Detailed info and pics
 Detailed history of the MG-1
 Service Manual and User Manual
 https://www.youtube.com/watch?v=x9-ig2H8WMM

Concertmate MG-1
RadioShack
Analog synthesizers
Monophonic synthesizers